Clea is a Marvel Comics character.

Clea may also refer to:

 Clea (band), a British pop group
 Clea (gastropod), a freshwater gastropod from family Buccinidae
 Clea (novel), a novel by Lawrence Durrell
 Clea Lake
 Cross-linked enzyme aggregate or CLEA, an immobilized enzyme
 Clea, a Delphic oracle
 Queen Clea, a DC Comics villainess and an enemy of Wonder Woman

People with the given name
 Clea DuVall (born 1977), actress
 Clea Hoyte (born 1981), West Indies cricketer
 Clea Koff (born 1972), British-born American forensic anthropologist and author
 Clea Lewis (born 1965), American actress
 Clea Simon (born 1961), American writer

See also
 Sir Henry Fletcher, 1st Baronet, of Clea Hall